Waipawa is the second-largest town in Central Hawke's Bay in the east of the North Island of New Zealand. It has a population of  

Waipawa was settled in the early 1860s, and the Settler's Museum exhibits many of these historical collections.

It holds the main office of the Central Hawke's Bay District Council, and is New Zealand's oldest inland European settlement.

Frederick Abbot was one of the early settlers and Waipawa was originally called Abbotsford, when the township was being sold in 1859, and there is still a children's home in Waipawa named Abbotsford. However, it was often shown as Abbotsford, Waipawa and Waipawa was more commonly used alone after the opening of the Waipawa railway station and Waipawa Mail in the late 1870s.

A local newspaper, the Waipawa Mail, was published for most of the period from 1878 to 1980. It was one of 45 started by Joseph Ivess. In 1980 it merged to become the CHB Mail, which is now a free weekly paper, published in Waipukurau.

Demographics

Waipawa had a population of 2,085 at the 2018 New Zealand census, an increase of 114 people (5.8%) since the 2013 census, and an increase of 159 people (8.3%) since the 2006 census. There were 843 households, comprising 990 males and 1,095 females, giving a sex ratio of 0.9 males per female. The median age was 43.3 years (compared with 37.4 years nationally), with 450 people (21.6%) aged under 15 years, 291 (14.0%) aged 15 to 29, 912 (43.7%) aged 30 to 64, and 429 (20.6%) aged 65 or older.

Ethnicities were 84.0% European/Pākehā, 25.3% Māori, 3.9% Pacific peoples, 1.7% Asian, and 1.4% other ethnicities. People may identify with more than one ethnicity.

The percentage of people born overseas was 13.8, compared with 27.1% nationally.

Although some people chose not to answer the census's question about religious affiliation, 54.2% had no religion, 32.5% were Christian, 2.3% had Māori religious beliefs, 0.1% were Buddhist and 2.7% had other religions.

Of those at least 15 years old, 216 (13.2%) people had a bachelor's or higher degree, and 408 (25.0%) people had no formal qualifications. The median income was $26,400, compared with $31,800 nationally. 105 people (6.4%) earned over $70,000 compared to 17.2% nationally. The employment status of those at least 15 was that 777 (47.5%) people were employed full-time, 261 (16.0%) were part-time, and 45 (2.8%) were unemployed.

Marae

Waipawa has two marae affiliated with the iwi of Ngāti Kahungunu. The Mataweka Marae and Nohomaiterangi meeting house are affiliated with the hapū of Ngāi Toroiwaho and Ngāti Whatuiāpiti. The Tapairu Marae and Te Rangitahi or Te Whaea o te Katoa meeting house are affiliated with the hapū of Ngāti Mārau o Kahungunu.

In October 2020, the Government committed $887,291 from the Provincial Growth Fund to upgrade the two marae and three others, creating 12 jobs.

Education

Waipawa School is a Year 1-8 co-educational state primary school.

Waipawa used to have a secondary school, Waipawa District High School. This was merged in 1959 with Waipukurau District High School to make Central Hawke's Bay College based in Waipukurau.

Waipawa has been home to several youth organisations. Namely, the New Zealand Cadet Forces's ATC branch, as well as a Scouts New Zealand branch. However, since 2000, both major youth organisations have gone into recess.

Waipawa railway station 
From at least 1870 Waipawa was served by mail coaches running between Napier and Waipukurau.

On Monday 28 August 1876 the railway was extended from Te Aute to Waipawa, later becoming part of the Palmerston North–Gisborne Line. It was part of the Paki Paki to Waipukurau contract, tendered on 15 July 1874 for £19,532 by Charles McKirdy, of Wellington, who built the Rimutaka Incline and several other lines. A local contractor tendered £29,173. There were allegations of mismanagement and disputes about the contracts. For example, the work was started by the international contractor, Brogdens. However, in 1876, the Minister for Public Works, Edward Richardson, attributed delays only to unexpectedly heavy land claims and floods. S Tracey and Allen, of Napier, tendered £7,989 for track for the Paki Paki-Waipawa length in September 1875, but they lost the contract in May 1876, due to slow progress. Waipawa started with 2 trains a day in each direction, increased to 3 in 1883 and 4 in 1896. Waipawa had 7 trains a day in 1940.

Waipawa was the terminus for 3 days, until a  extension to Waipukurau opened on 1 September 1876. The contract for laying the track for the  southerly extension of the line to Takapau was advertised in April 1876. The line to Waipukurau was built by Brogdens for £9,469 7s 9d. Donald Ross built the  bridges over the Waipawa and Tukituki Rivers for £23,410. In 1875 construction of the Waipawa bridge, just south of Waipawa, was delayed by timber supplies. The bridge was strengthened in 1911 and rebuilt in 1939.

When the station opened, McLeod's contract for a 5th class stationmaster's house had been completed in October 1875 and Richard Phillips' contract for the station buildings by 22 March 1876. Following the opening Richard Phillips extended the station over the next couple of years. By 1896 Waipawa had a 4th class station, platform ( wide in 1912), cart approach to platform,  x  goods shed, loading bank, cattle yards, stationmaster's house, urinals and a passing loop for 42 wagons, extended to 49 by 1911 and 80 in 1940. Fires damaged the station in 1896 and 1899. In 1905 Richard Phillips rebuilt the station and goods shed. Railway houses were built in 1905 and 1928. A verandah was added in 1908 and can be seen in a 1913 photo. In 1912 an automatic tablet exchanger was added, by which time the lean-to station had luggage and parcels rooms, an office, vestibule, ladies waiting room and a 1½ ton crane. By 1914 the goods shed has been doubled in length. Electricity was connected in 1928. In the annual returns of traffic, Waipawa was one of the medium sized stations on the line. For example, in 1925 it sold 15,446 tickets and handled 74,062 pigs and sheep.

On 6 December 1981 the station closed to passengers, it was an unattended station from 20 November 1983, closed to all but parcels on 18 August 1984 and closed completely on 2 November 1984. By 1987 only a platform and goods shed remained. The platform, goods shed and a single track still remain.

Notes

Central Hawke's Bay District
Populated places in the Hawke's Bay Region